Ongendus (perhaps Angantyr in Danish) was a king of the Danes, reigning c. 710, the first Danish king known from contemporary literature.

Historical background 
He was presumably king of a stronger and more unified Denmark that rose at the end of the 7th century.

Ongendus' reign probably followed the rise of a strong kingdom in central Jutland which lasted from about 200 to 600 CE, and from 400 also included Kent and Isle of Wight.

Given the time we must assume that Ongendus was involved with the construction of the Danevirke, as it was under construction at this time.

He may have founded Ribe, and reinforced Danevirke in 737.

Literal knowledge 
About 710, Saint Willibrord visited the Danes whilst Ongendus was ruling and returned with 30 boys to instruct in missionary work. No further details are given about Ongendus, other than that he was "more savage than any beast and harder than stone" — the ideal of man in the Viking Age. Against Willibrord's account, however, one should also consider that he was apparently well received, could travel in peace through Ongendus' realm and was allowed to return with his potential disciples, so the savagery of Ongendus may well be overstated. It may just have been the obligatory classification of any heathen ruler.

Further reading
Alcuin's Life of St. Willibrord, translated in C. H. Talbot, "The Anglo-Saxon Missionaries in Germany" (London and New York, 1954), especially pp. 9–10.

See also
List of legendary kings of Denmark

Footnotes

Danish monarchs
8th-century monarchs in Europe